The 1948 Oklahoma Sooners football team represented the University of Oklahoma in the 1948 college football season. In their second year under head coach Bud Wilkinson, the Sooners compiled a 10–1 record (5–0 against conference opponents), won the Big Seven Conference championship, and outscored their opponents by a combined total of 350 to 121.

Two Sooners received All-America honors in 1948, Buddy Burris, and Jack Mitchell. Six Sooners received all-conference honors: Burris (guard), Mitchell (back), Owens (end), Paine (tackle), Thomas (back), and Walker (tackle).

Schedule

Roster
Claude Arnold
Jack Mitchell
QB Darrell Royal, Jr.

Rankings

Postseason

NFL Draft
Two Sooners were selected in the 1949 NFL Draft, held in December 1948.

 Owens played another season for Oklahoma in 1949.

References

Oklahoma
Oklahoma Sooners football seasons
Big Eight Conference football champion seasons
Sugar Bowl champion seasons
Oklahoma Sooners football